Twain Harte is a census-designated place (CDP) in Tuolumne County, California, United States. The population was 2,226 at the 2010 census, down from 2,586 at the 2000 census. Its name is derived from the last names of two famous authors who lived in California, Mark Twain and Bret Harte.

Geography
Twain Harte is located at  (38.040390, -120.233671).

The USPS zip code for Twain Harte is 95383.

Its municipal water supply comes from the nearby Lyons Reservoir in the Stanislaus National Forest.

Twain Harte is both a summer and winter vacation community situated at the transition zone between the oak forest of the California foothills and the mixed pine and fir forest of the Sierra Nevada. Summers are warm during the day and the nights are generally mild; making Twain Harte a pleasant escape from the long, hot summers of the California Central Valley. Winters can be very cool with snow occurring several times during the season. Winter sports venues are located nearby at Leland High Sierra Snowplay near Strawberry (snow tubing), Long Barn Lodge & Ice Skating Rink, and Dodge Ridge Ski Area near Pinecrest are all along Highway 108, plus the Badger Pass Ski Area in nearby Yosemite Park.

Places of interest
Twain Harte is home to the Twain Harte Village (the largest shopping center in the area), Twain Harte Golf Club (a golf course design by Clark Glasson), and Twain Harte Lake (a man-made lake and small resort).

Demographics

2010
The 2010 United States Census reported that Twain Harte had a population of 2,226. The racial makeup of Twain Harte was 2,026 (91.0%) White, 5 (0.2%) African American, 34 (1.5%) Native American, 31 (1.4%) Asian, 4 (0.2%) Pacific Islander, 46 (2.1%) from other races, and 80 (3.6%) from two or more races. Hispanic or Latino of any race were 171 persons (7.7%).

The Census reported that 2,226 people (100% of the population) lived in households, 0 (0%) lived in non-institutionalized group quarters, and 0 (0%) were institutionalized.

There were 1,014 households, out of which 198 (19.5%) had children under the age of 18 living in them, 544 (53.6%) were opposite-sex married couples living together, 83 (8.2%) had a female householder with no husband present, 50 (4.9%) had a male householder with no wife present.  There were 56 (5.5%) unmarried opposite-sex partnerships, and 6 (0.6%) same-sex married couples or partnerships. 273 households (26.9%) were made up of individuals, and 125 (12.3%) had someone living alone who was 65 years of age or older. The average household size was 2.20.  There were 677 families (66.8% of all households); the average family size was 2.60.

The population was spread out, with 355 people (15.9%) under the age of 18, 137 people (6.2%) aged 18 to 24, 387 people (17.4%) aged 25 to 44, 772 people (34.7%) aged 45 to 64, and 575 people (25.8%) who were 65 years of age or older.  The median age was 52.0 years. For every 100 females, there were 105.9 males.  For every 100 females age 18 and over, there were 103.8 males.

The homeowner vacancy rate was 3.5%; the rental vacancy rate was 12.0%.  1,501 people (67.4% of the population) lived in owner-occupied housing units and 725 people (32.6%) lived in rental housing units.

2000
As of the census of 2000, there were 2,586 people, 1,120 households, and 779 families residing in the CDP. The racial makeup of the CDP was 93.23% White, 0.12% African American, 1.01% Native American, 0.73% Asian, 0.54% Pacific Islander, 1.08% from other races, and 3.29% from two or more races. Hispanic or Latino of any race were 5.53% of the population.

There were 1,120 households, out of which 24.6% had children under the age of 18 living with them, 55.4% were married couples living together, 11.2% had a female householder with no husband present, and 30.4% were non-families. 24.6% of all households were made up of individuals, and 10.4% had someone living alone who was 65 years of age or older.  The average household size was 2.31 and the average family size was 2.69.

In the CDP the population was spread out, with 21.4% under the age of 18, 6.1% from 18 to 24, 19.8% from 25 to 44, 31.7% from 45 to 64, and 21.0% who were 65 years of age or older.  The median age was 46 years. For every 100 females, there were 98.9 males.  For every 100 females age 18 and over, there were 92.5 males.

The median income for a household in the CDP was $46,920, and the median income for a family was $51,865. Males had a median income of $40,313 versus $26,964 for females. The per capita income for the CDP was $23,079.  About 5.0% of families and 6.4% of the population were below the poverty line, including 6.5% of those under age 18 and 3.2% of those age 65 or over.

Government

See also
Bret Harte, California, a CDP in Stanislaus County

References

External links
 Twain Harte Area Chamber of Commerce official Web site

Census-designated places in Tuolumne County, California
Populated places in the Sierra Nevada (United States)